Cherubino Manzoni, O.F.M. (1595–1651) was a Roman Catholic prelate who served as Bishop of Termoli (1644–1651) and Bishop of Lavello (1635–1644).

Biography
Cherubino Manzoni was born in Naples, Italy in 1595 and ordained a priest in the Order of Friars Minor. 
On 9 July 1635, he was appointed during the papacy of Pope Urban VIII as Bishop of Lavello. On 26 August 1635, he was consecrated bishop by Francesco Maria Brancaccio, Cardinal-Priest of Santi XII Apostoli, with Alessandro Suardi, Bishop of Lucera, and Sigismondo Taddei, Bishop of Bitetto, serving as co-consecrators.
On 13 July 1644, he was appointed during the papacy of Pope Urban VIII as Bishop of Termoli.
He served as Bishop of Termoli until his death in 1651.

References

External links and additional sources
 (Chronology of Bishops) 
 (Chronology of Bishops) 
 (Chronology of Bishops) 
 (Chronology of Bishops) 

17th-century Italian Roman Catholic bishops
Bishops appointed by Pope Urban VIII
1595 births
1651 deaths
Franciscan bishops